Richmond High School is a high school in Richmond, Michigan.  The school is a part of Richmond Community Schools and educates students in grades 9–12.

Athletics
Competitive cheerleading — state champion — 2012, 2013, 2019, 2020, 2021, 2022
Soccer (boys) — state champion — 2006
Softball — state champion — 2016, 2021
Volleyball — state champion — 1983
Wrestling — state champion — 2000, 2002, 2006, 2010, 2011, 2012, 2015, 2017

References

External links
 Richmond High School

Public high schools in Michigan
Schools in Macomb County, Michigan
Schools in St. Clair County, Michigan